Vladimir Žerjavić (2 August 1912 – 5 September 2001) was a Croatian economist and demographer who published a series of historical articles and books during the 1980s and 1990s on demographic losses in Yugoslavia during World War II and of Axis forces and civilians in the Bleiburg repatriations shortly after the capitulation of Germany. From 1964 to 1982, he worked as an adviser for industrial development in the United Nations Economic Commission for Africa.

Early life
Žerjavić was born in Križ, Zagreb County and graduated at the Faculty of Economics at the University of Zagreb. He was one of four siblings, having two sisters, Viktorija (1908–1993) and Darinka (1921–2009) and a brother, Slavko. After 1934 he worked in the private sector, and after 1945 in various institutions of SFR Yugoslavia. Between 1958 and 1982 he worked abroad as an industrial consultant. In 1964 he joined the United Nations Economic Commission for Africa and later consulted the governments of various nations.

Žerjavić's calculations regarding World War II in Yugoslavia
In the 1980s Žerjavić conducted a research on demographic losses in Yugoslavia during World War II, at about the same time as Bogoljub Kočović, a Serb statistician. Žerjavić's calculations of total victims in Yugoslavia are based on looking at pre- and post-war censuses. Zerjavić asserted that Yugoslavia lost a total 1,027,000 people in World War II.

Of those, the vast majority, 623,000 people, died in the Independent State of Croatia - 295,000 in Croatia itself, and 328,000 in Bosnia and Herzegovina (both part of the Independent State of Croatia and under the Ustaše regime at the time), and another 36,000 from those countries died abroad. According to ethnicity and/or religion as needed, Žerjavić provided the following estimates of victims in the Independent State of Croatia, for both the war and immediate post-war period:

322,000 Serbs
192,000 Croats
77,000 Muslims
26,000 Jews
16,000 Roma

His claims include 153,000 civilian victims in Croatia and 174,000 in Bosnia and Herzegovina, and of that, 85,000 people from Bosnia and Herzegovina and 48,000 from Croatia died in concentration camps. As for the total casualties in Jasenovac concentration camp, he estimated that 85,000 were killed, of which 45–52,000 were Serbs, 13,000 were Jews, 10,000 were Roma, 10,000 were Croats and 2,000 were Muslims.

With regard to Serbs, Žerjavić's calculation ended with a total of 197,000 Serbian civilian victims within the borders of the Independent State of Croatia: 50,000 at Jasenovac concentration camp, 25,000 of typhoid, 45,000 killed by the Germans, 15,000 killed by Italians, 34,000 civilians killed in battles between Ustaše, Chetniks and Partisans, 28,000 killed in prisons, pits and other camps, etc. Another 125,000 Serbs inside the Independent State of Croatia were killed as combatants, raising the total to 322,000.

Regarding the Yugoslav Partisan pursuit of Nazi collaborators, when soldiers and civilians associated with the NDH and other Axis forces were killed by the Yugoslav Partisans, Žerjavić estimated that around 45–55,000 Croats and Bosniaks, 8-10,000 Slovenes, and around 2,000 Serbs and Montenegrins were killed.

Žerjavić's opinions and statements

Žerjavić's investigations and statistical analyses, like others such as Kočović's examinations, aim to show that the original number of lives lost on all sides during World War II in Yugoslavia was considerably exaggerated, partly due to the war reparations claims by the Yugoslav government shortly after the war.

An excerpt from Žerjavić's book Manipulations with WW2 victims in Yugoslavia reads:

Independent verification

Positive
Some international agencies and experts have accepted Žerjavić's (and almost equal data achieved by Serbian statistician Bogoljub Kočović) calculations as the most reliable data on war losses in Yugoslavia during World War II. A U.S. Census report from 1954 states: "Details of the (Yugoslav) 1948 census were kept secret but, in negotiations with Germany, it became apparent that the real figure of the dead was about one million. An American study in 1954 calculated 1,067,000."

Following Tito's death in 1980, the 1948 census results became available for comparison with those of 1931. Allowances had to be made for the birth rates of the different communities and for emigration. Research was pioneered by Professor Kočović, a Serb living in the West, whose findings were published in January 1985. He assessed the number of dead as 1,014,000. Later that year a Serbian Academy of Sciences and Arts Conference heard that the figure was 1,100,000.

Žerjavić's and Kočović's calculations of war losses in Yugoslavia during World War II were accepted by the United States Holocaust Memorial Museum, together with other typically higher estimates:

Due to differing views and lack of documentation, estimates for the number of Serbian victims in Croatia range widely, from 25,000 to more than one million. The estimated number of Serbs killed in Jasenovac ranges from 25,000 to 700,000. The most reliable figures place the number of Serbs killed by the Ustaša between 330,000 and 390,000, with 45,000 to 52,000 Serbs murdered in Jasenovac.

Concerning Žerjavić's calculations on the number of casualties linked to the Bleiburg repatriations, historian Ivo Goldstein writes that it is "difficult to speak of the overall number" and that "the only option is to rely on the research by Vladimir Žerjavić, which has up to now shown itself to be the most reliable in overall estimates".

Negative
Some Serb critics of Žerjavić consider his work to have been politically motivated, with the aim of downplaying Croatian nationalist atrocities during the war, such as at Jasenovac.

Critics point out that Serbs in Bosnia and Croatia lived in rural areas and therefore had a much higher growth rate than others. Žerjavić used growth rates for Serbs in Bosnia as 1.1% (as for all nations together), while actual growth rate was 2.4% (1921–31) and 3.5% (1949–53). They posit he intentionally underestimated growth rate of Serbs to decrease the Serb death count, according to critics. Some, like Đorđević, claimed that Serbian losses were in fact 1.6 million, a number which goes in other direction compared to the official estimates that Žerjavić denied. The higher numbers was opposed by Bogoljub Kočović's book, published in 1997, which tries to refute Đorđević's efforts to "reinstate" the "great numbers" victims figures dominant in Communist Yugoslavia.

The Simon Wiesenthal Center and Yad Vashem still use the old estimates given by the Yugoslav authorities. The Simon Wiesenthal Center cites the Yad Vashem document, the Encyclopedia of the Holocaust. In a separate entry on the Ustasha movement in general, however, Yad Vashem cites the extermination of "over 500,000" Serbs in the entire NDH.

Regarding Žerjavić's research on World War Two casualties, Croatian historian Vladimir Geiger notes that individual researchers who assert the inevitability of using identification of casualties and fatalities by individual names have raised serious objections to Žerjavić's calculations/estimates of human losses by using standard statistical methods and consolidation of data from various sources, pointing out that such an approach is insufficient and unreliable in determining the number and character of casualties and fatalities, as well as the affiliation of the perpetrators of the crimes.

Žerjavić's calculations regarding the Bosnian war
According to Žerjavić's calculations, there were 215,000 victims in Bosnia-Herzegovina  in the Bosnian war of 1992–95, of which 160,000 were Bosniaks, 30,000 Croats and 25,000 Serbs. However, according to newer research done by the International Criminal Tribunal for the former Yugoslavia (ICTY), the number of people killed in the war in Bosnia-Herzegovina was around 102,000:  69.24% (70,625) Bosniaks, 25.35% (25,857) Serbs, and 5.33% (5,437) Croats.

References

Sources

External links
Dinko Sakic trial, srce.hr; accessed 10 November 2015.
"Žrtve licitiranja "Sahrana jednog mita, Bogoljub Kočović", knjizara.com; accessed 10 November 2015. 
Human Rights Watch: "Šansa za pravdu? Procesuiranje ratnih zločina u bosanskoj Republici Srpskoj: Kontekst" (March 2006); accessed 10 November 2015. 

1912 births
2001 deaths
People from Križ
People from the Kingdom of Croatia-Slavonia
20th-century Croatian economists
Faculty of Economics and Business, University of Zagreb alumni
United Nations experts
Place of death missing
Burials at Mirogoj Cemetery
Yugoslav economists